Hemileiocassis panjang is a species of bagrid catfish endemic to Indonesia.  It grows to a length of 13.9 cm.  It is the only member of its genus.

References

 

Bagridae
Fish described in 2000
Fish of Southeast Asia
Freshwater fish of Indonesia